Chicago, Milwaukee, St. Paul and Pacific Depot – Delmar is a historic building located in Delmar, Iowa, United States. It is listed on the National Register of Historic Places.

History
The original station was built in Delmar in the 1870s and the present structure was built for the Chicago, Milwaukee, St. Paul & Pacific Railroad (Milwaukee Road) in 1905. The depot is a rectangular, single story, wood-frame building built of a standard design for rural stations. There were waiting rooms (one for men and the other for women) at one end of the depot and a freight room at the other end. While this was not unusual in the Eastern United States, it was a unique design for the Midwest.  In between the waiting rooms and the freight room was the station agent's office.

Delmar owes its existence to railroads. Three railroads converged there in the late 1870s and it was named Delmar Junction. Eventually, only the Milwaukee Road remained and was a strong influence on the development of the town. The depot was located on the Milwaukee Road's mainline from Chicago to Omaha.

The depot remained in use until 1977. After that, it remained vacant until it was purchased by the City of Delmar. The last freight train used the station in 1982.  Restoration of the building began in 1995, and it was listed on the National Register of Historic Places in 1997. It now houses the Delmar Depot Museum, which contains a collection of over 1,500 historical items. The site also includes an old caboose named "Elizabeth" and a mural on the old viaduct wall that commemorates the Orphan Train.

References

Railway stations on the National Register of Historic Places in Iowa
Delmar, Iowa
Railway stations in the United States opened in 1905
Railway stations closed in 1977
Transportation buildings and structures in Clinton County, Iowa
National Register of Historic Places in Clinton County, Iowa
1905 establishments in Iowa
1977 disestablishments in Iowa
Former railway stations in Iowa
Museums in Clinton County, Iowa